Lieutenant General Hugo MacNeill (1900–1963) was a twentieth-century Irish soldier and first president of the Organisation of National Ex-Servicemen in Ireland.

Life and military career
Born in 1900, he was the nephew of politician Eoin MacNeill (1867–1945).

Hugo MacNeill was member of Fianna Éireann and the Irish Volunteers before becoming an officer of the National Army during the Irish Civil War. In 1923, he was promoted to colonel after an intelligence windfall allowed him to prevent a series of Irish Republican Army (IRA) attacks in Dublin. In 1924 he was promoted to major general and appointed assistant Chief of Staff of the National Army.

In 1926 MacNeill attended the US Army Command and Staff Course in Fort Leavenworth, Kansas. He was in command of the Irish Army's Second (Northern) Division during The Emergency (1939-1945).

He was promoted to lieutenant general in 1946, although without appointment.

MacNeill's main activity following retirement was the co-ordination of An Tóstal festivals in the 1950s. He was also the first president of the Organisation of National Ex-Servicemen. He died in 1963.

Controversies
MacNeill was reputedly sympathetic to German interests, and some sources suggest he approached the German diplomatic legation in the early 1940s, without apparent authorisation. These approaches were reputedly to seek German assistance in the event that Britain invaded neutral Ireland. Playing both sides, he accepted the covert aid of the British Army in training his division, notably in the establishment of a "battle school" at Gormanston and secret training of selected Irish troops in commando techniques in Northern Ireland.

References 

Irish Army generals
National Army (Ireland) officers
1900 births
1963 deaths
Non-U.S. alumni of the Command and General Staff College